Gilia Island is an island in Papua New Guinea, part of the Calvados Chain within the Louisiade Archipelago. It is located near Bagaman Island. 
It is used as a coconut camp for the men of Bagaman.
In recent years, Bagaman islanders use Gilia for claiming coconuts.

References

Islands of Milne Bay Province
Louisiade Archipelago